Ophthalmitis satoi is a moth of the family Geometridae first described by Jeremy Daniel Holloway in 1993. It is found in Borneo.

Its wingspan is 26–29 mm.

External links

Boarmiini